Benadalid is a town and municipality in the province of Málaga, part of the autonomous community of Andalusia in southern Spain. The municipality is situated approximately 25 kilometres from Ronda and 145 from the provincial capital. It has a population of approximately 258 residents. The natives are called Benalizos.

References

External links

Official site 

Municipalities in the Province of Málaga